Nothing Else Matters is the third studio album by Marvin Sapp.

Track listing

Chart positions

References

1999 albums
Marvin Sapp albums